Cornelis Musius (1500–1572) was a Dutch Catholic priest and New Latin poet. He was the last rector of the Sint Agathaklooster in Delft, until hanged without due process on 10 or 11 December 1572. Although never officially canonised, he has long been regarded as a martyr by Dutch Catholics.

Life
Musius is thought to have been born in Delft on 11 June 1500 (although the sources are not unanimous, some giving alternative dates or locations). He was the son of Johannes Pietersz Muys, a descendant of the Dordrecht patrician lineage of Muys van Holy, and Elisabeth Woudana. He was orphaned young and began a clerical career. He studied theology at Leuven University, and travelled in Flanders and France, spending time in Ghent, Arras, Paris and Poitiers. He then became rector of the Sint Agathaklooster in Delft, a post he held for 35 years, while writing Latin verse and corresponding with numerous scholars he had met on his travels. He commissioned paintings for the convent from Maarten van Heemskerck, a close personal friend.

After the rebel takeover of Delft in 1572, Musius remained in place, a well-regarded intellectual. On contravening a curfew for members of the Catholic clergy and religious orders, leaving the city to bring church treasures to safety, he was hunted down by the Lord of Lumey and transported to Leiden. There, despite having a letter of safeguard from William of Orange, he was beaten, tortured and hanged.

His sufferings were described in Richard Verstegan's Theatrum crudelitatum (Antwerp, 1587) and in book 10 of Petrus Opmeer's Historia martyrum Batavicorum (Cologne, 1625).

Works
Institutio foeminae christianae ex ultimo capite Proverbiorum Salomonis (1536)
Solitudo sive Vita Solitaria laudata (Antwerp, Christopher Plantin, 1566). Available on Google Books.

References

1500 births
1572 deaths
People from Delft
Old University of Leuven alumni
16th-century Dutch Roman Catholic priests
16th-century Latin-language writers
Dutch people of the Eighty Years' War